Hans-Volker Niemeier is a German mathematician who in 1973 classified the Niemeier lattices, the even positive definite unimodular lattices in 24 dimensions.

References

Year of birth missing (living people)
Living people
20th-century German mathematicians
21st-century German mathematicians